Herminia Borchard Dassel (born Herminia Borchard; 1821 – December 7, 1857), also known as Hermine Dassel, was a German-American painter, notable for her portraits and genre paintings.

Biography

Early life and education 
Dassel was born to a wealthy family in Königsberg, Prussia in 1821. Her father's job as a banker ensured her a privileged upbringing with an emphasis on education. Her father was bankrupted in 1839 and as a result her family lost their fortune, prompting Dassel to sell paintings to financially support her family. Later that year, she moved to Düsseldorf, Germany to study under Carl Sohn at the Düsseldorf School of Painting. Dassel left the Düsseldorf School of Painting in 1842 and continued to sell paintings, earning enough money so that she was able to study in Italy. There she painted a number of genre scenes, which gained her recognition throughout the United States and Europe. She was then forced to flee Italy because of the Revolution of 1848, settling in Philadelphia, Pennsylvania in 1849.

Career and later life 
Dassel found a great deal of success upon her arrival in the United States, with her work being displayed in the American Art-Union, Boston Athenaeum, and the National Academy of Design. In June 1850, the National Academy of Design selected her to be one of the first female honorary members.

Dassel married her husband in July 1849 and had three children. She and her family moved to New York in 1850, where she earned her living by painting portraits of members of the upper classes. During this time, she used her personal art studio to become a painting instructor to girls from wealthy families in New York. In her time as a teacher, she was described as being well-liked by all and having a fervent passion for art.

Dassel painted some of her most well-known portraits on a visit to Nantucket in 1851. She took a particular interest in the remaining Native American population on the island, painting the portraits of Abram Quary and Isabella Draper. At the time, Quary was thought to be the last fully Wampanoag person living in Nantucket, and Draper was a young girl of Wampanoag descent. Dassel was also commissioned to paint astronomer Maria Mitchell's portrait while she was in Nantucket.

Death 
Dassel was reported to have been ill shortly before her death on December 7, 1857. She was buried in Greenwood, New York. After her death, Henry T. Tuckerman arranged an exhibition and sale of her work, with the profits going toward her children.

Work 
An Italian Flower Girl, 1849

Mrs. John Taylor Johnston (Frances Colles) and Her Daughter, c. 1850s

Mrs. James N. Paulding (Emily Pearson), c. 1850s

Nantucket Indian Princess (originally titled An Indian Girl), 1851 in the Rhode Island Historical Society collection

Portrait of Abram Quary, 1851

Portrait of Maria Mitchell, 1851

Ann Saltonstall Seabury (Mrs. William Walton), 1856

Ellen, Kezia and Mary Seabury, 1856

References 

American women artists
19th-century American women artists
1821 births
1857 deaths